State Route 151 (SR 151) is a  state highway in Pinson in the northeastern part of Jefferson County, in the central part of the U.S. state of Alabama. The southern terminus of the highway is at an intersection with SR 79. The northern terminus is at an intersection with SR 75. It is known as Tapawingo Road for its entire length. At its northern terminus, SR 75 takes on the Tapawingo Road name.

Route description

SR 151 begins at an intersection with SR 79 (Pinson Valley Parkway/New Bradford Road) on the western edge of Pinson. Here, the roadway continues as Jefferson County Route 131 (CR 131; Narrows Road). SR 151 travels to the east-southeast and, almost immediately, crosses over Beaver Creek. It is aligned along a four-lane undivided highway along its entire length. It curves to the east-northeast and reaches its northern terminus, an intersection with SR 75 (Center Point Road/Tapawingo Road). Although it is signed as a south–north route, the orientation of the highway is actually east–west.

History

Prior to its designation as SR 151 in 1993, the highway was signed as "TO SR 75" at its southern terminus and "TO SR 79" at its northern terminus.

Major intersections

See also

References

External links

151
Transportation in Jefferson County, Alabama
State highways in the United States shorter than one mile